Murmansk was a light cruiser project no. 68-bis (designated the  by NATO) of the Soviet and later the Russian Navy's Northern Fleet.

Development and design 

The Sverdlov-class cruisers, Soviet designation Project 68bis, were the last conventional gun cruisers built for the Soviet Navy. They were built in the 1950s and were based on Soviet, German, and Italian designs and concepts developed prior to the Second World War. They were modified to improve their sea keeping capabilities, allowing them to run at high speed in the rough waters of the North Atlantic. The basic hull was more modern and had better armor protection than the vast majority of the post Second World War gun cruiser designs built and deployed by peer nations. They also carried an extensive suite of modern radar equipment and anti-aircraft artillery. The Soviets originally planned to build 40 ships in the class, which would be supported by the s and aircraft carriers.

The Sverdlov class displaced 13,600 tons standard and 16,640 tons at full load. The hull was a completely welded new design and the ships had a double bottom for over 75% of their length. The ship also had twenty-three watertight bulkheads. The Sverdlovs had six boilers providing steam to two shaft geared steam turbines generating .

Sverdlov-class cruisers main armament included twelve /57 cal B-38 guns mounted in four triple Mk5-bis turrets. They also had twelve /56 cal Model 1934 guns in six twin SM-5-1 mounts. For anti-aircraft weaponry, the cruisers had thirty-two  anti-aircraft guns in sixteen twin mounts and were also equipped with ten  torpedo tubes in two mountings of five each.

The Sverdlovs had  belt armor and had a  armored deck. The turrets were shielded by  armor and the conning tower, by  armor.

The cruisers' ultimate radar suite included one 'Big Net' or 'Top Trough' air search radar, one 'High Sieve' or 'Low Sieve' air search radar, one 'Knife Rest' air search radar and one 'Slim Net' air search radar. For navigational radar they had one 'Don-2' or 'Neptune' model. For fire control purposes the ships were equipped with two 'Sun Visor' radars, two 'Top Bow' 152 mm gun radars and eight 'Egg Cup' gun radars. For electronic countermeasures the ships were equipped with two 'Watch Dog' ECM systems.

Construction and career 
She was laid down in Severodvinsk in 1953 and commissioned on 22 September 1955. Murmansk joined the 2nd Cruiser Division on the division's formation in 1956.

In 1994 Murmansk was sold to India for scrapping but ran aground off the Norwegian village of Sørvær during the transfer. During that time, a photo was taken by a native Norwegian that had shown the ship in almost perfect condition with a massive list. It was first estimated that the winter storms would destroy parts of Murmansk above the water, but the ship remained in one piece and in 2009 funding was allocated to pay for the dismantling of the vessel.

Since the ship was in a very bad state when the decision to remove it was made, there was no possibility to tow it. Scandinavia's largest demolition contractor, AF Decom, constructed a massive breakwater and cofferdam around Murmansk to access the shipwreck from land and demolish it where it rested. The cofferdam around the wreck was sealed in April 2012. By mid-May the dock was almost empty of water and the demolition of the cruiser began. The project was completed in 2013.

Environmental organizations Veolia and Bellona announced they have found "source of radioactivity" in 2008, which unrolled a wave of panic among local residents, who even started to find "increased incidence of cancer". It was later confirmed as luminescent paint on some indicators and switches, with content of isotopes so small that it has no biologic impact. The ship however contained a number of other toxic substances such as remains of fuel, PCB, and asbestos.

Pennant numbers

Gallery

References

1955 ships
Sverdlov-class cruisers
Ships built in the Soviet Union
Maritime incidents in 1994
Shipwrecks in the Norwegian Sea
Hasvik
Ships built by Sevmash
Cold War cruisers of the Soviet Union